Rodolfo Esquivel Landa (born 9 June 1959) is a Mexican politician affiliated with the National Action Party. As of 2014 he served as Deputy of the LIX Legislature of the Mexican Congress representing Morelos.

References

1959 births
Living people
Politicians from Morelos
National Action Party (Mexico) politicians
Universidad Autónoma del Estado de Morelos alumni
21st-century Mexican politicians
Deputies of the LIX Legislature of Mexico
Members of the Chamber of Deputies (Mexico) for Morelos